Simon Hickey (6 June 1878 – 18 May 1958) was an Australian politician.

He was born at Botobolar near Mudgee to agricultural labourer Patrick Hickey, an Irish-American, and Mary, née Swift. His family moved to Menah in 1882 and to Auburn in 1890. Hickey received a primary education but at the age of thirteen left school to work as a drayman's assistant, eventually being apprenticed to a Mudgee saddler in 1893. He worked in Sydney for the saddler's firm, which failed. In 1911 he married Hilda Ellen Dacey, daughter of Labor MP John Dacey.

In 1912 he entered the New South Wales Legislative Assembly as the Labor member for Alexandria on the death of his father-in-law; he moved to the multi-member seat of Botany in 1920. The 1920 election was evenly divided with Labor only able to govern due to Nationalist Daniel Levy controversially accepting re-election as speaker. Levy resigned as speaker and on 13 December 1921 Hickey was elected Speaker. This left the Dooley Labor Government without a majority in parliament. Eight days later the government was defeated on the floor and resigned. Hickey resigned as speaker, replaced by Levy which enabled Labor to regain government. His term remains the shortest in the history of the Assembly. He was defeated in 1922 but in 1925 was given a life appointment to the New South Wales Legislative Council, which he held until the Council's reconstitution in 1934.

Hickey's memoir, Travelled Roads, was published in 1951.

His son was Sir Justin Hickey.

References

 

1878 births
1958 deaths
Speakers of the New South Wales Legislative Assembly
Members of the New South Wales Legislative Assembly
Members of the New South Wales Legislative Council
Australian Labor Party members of the Parliament of New South Wales